Maksar is a village in Khuzestan Province, Iran

Maksar or Moksar may refer to:
 Maksar-e Magatif
 Maksar-e Olya
 Maksar-e Sofla
 Maksar-e Vosta